Henry "Hen" Pearce (7 May 1777, in Bristol – 30 April 1809, at St. Martin's Lane, London) was an English bare-knuckle prizefighter who fought under the London Prize Ring rules and was the recognised English Champion from 1804 until his retirement due to ill health in 1807.

Pearce was known as "The Game Chicken", a nickname probably derived from his habit of signing his name "Hen" instead of Henry.  He was reckoned a fast, skillful boxer who hit hard with both fists.

On 6 December 1805, Pearce defeated Jem Belcher in a Championship decider (a fight reported in Pierce Egan's first volume of Boxiana).

He was inducted into the Ring Boxing Hall of Fame in 1987 and the International Boxing Hall of Fame in 1993.

External Sources
Chapter on Pearce in Boxiana, or Sketches of Ancient and Modern Pugilism volume 1, 1830, Pierce Egan
Chapter on Pearce in Pugilistica, the History of British Boxing volume 1, 1906, Henry Downes Miles

See also
 List of bare-knuckle boxers

References

1777 births
1809 deaths
Bare-knuckle boxers
English male boxers
Sportspeople from Bristol
Tuberculosis deaths in England
19th-century deaths from tuberculosis